Kha with descender (Ҳ ҳ; italics: Ҳ ҳ) is a letter of the Cyrillic script. In Unicode, this letter is called "Ha with descender". Its form is derived from the Cyrillic letter Kha (Х х Х х).

Kha with descender is used in the alphabet of the following languages:

Computing codes

See also
Ⱨ ⱨ : Latin letter H with descender
Ĥ ĥ : Latin letter H with circumflex 
Cyrillic characters in Unicode

References

Cyrillic letters with diacritics
Letters with descender (diacritic)